The 1999–2000 Úrvalsdeild kvenna was the 42nd season of the Úrvalsdeild kvenna, the top tier women's basketball league in Iceland. The season started on October 2, 1999 and ended on April 10, 2000. Keflavík won its ninth title by defeating KR 3–2 in the Finals.

Competition format
The participating teams first played a conventional round-robin schedule with every team playing each opponent twice "home" and twice "away" for a total of 20 games. The top four teams qualified for the championship playoffs while none were relegated to Division I due to vacant berths.

Regular season

Playoffs

Source: 2000 Úrvalsdeild kvenna playoffs

References

External links
Official Icelandic Basketball Federation website

Icelandic
Lea
Úrvalsdeild kvenna seasons (basketball)